Whitesand is an Ojibwe First Nation reserve in northwestern Ontario. It serves as the land base for the Whitesand First Nation, alongside their settlement at Armstrong.

References

External links
Indigenous and Northern Affairs Canada

Ojibwe reserves in Ontario
Communities in Thunder Bay District